Marlene Stewart may refer to:

 Marlene Streit (born 1934), née Stewart, Canadian golfer
 Marlene Stewart (costume designer) (born 1949), American costume designer